Smerek may refer to:
Smerek, Podkarpackie Voivodeship, village in Poland
, mountain in Western Bieszczady Mountains, Poland
, river in Western Bieszczady Mountains, Poland
Smerek (surname)

pl:Smerek